Wahab Olasupo Egbewole is a Professor of International law and jurisprudence and a Senior Advocate of Nigeria and the Vice-Chancellor of the University of Ilorin in Nigeria. He is a professor Professor in the Department of Jurisprudence and International Law, University of Ilorin. He was appointed after 25 years of working with the University as a lecturer. He is an academic and a published author.

Background 
Egbewole hails from Ile-ife, of Osun State, Nigeria. He was once the Director of the General Studies Division of the university.

He served on the university's Senate and Governing Council before being named Professor of Jurisprudence and International Law in 2012.

Career 
Wahab Egbewole joined started his career at the University of Ilorin in 1997 as a Lecturer II. He was called to the Nigerian Bar as a Solicitor and Advocate on 20th August, 1985. Prof Egbewole’s served at the Law Faculty as the Acting Head of Department, Sub-Dean, Acting Dean of Law, Dean of Law in 2010 among others. He has also served the University of Ilorin as the Director, General Studies Division. In 2012, Egbewole was appointed as a Professor of Jurisprudence and International law.

Publications 

 Education law, strategic policy, and sustainable development in Africa : Agenda 2063, 2017-2018 
 Judicial independence in Africa 2017-2018
 Law and sustainable development in Africa, 2012 
 Readings in jurisprudence & international law, 2004 
 Law and climate change in Nigeria, 2011 
 Education Law, Strategic Policy and Sustainable Development in Africa : Agenda 2063, 2018 
 Perspectives on the legislature in the government of Nigeria, 2010 
 Judex : hope for the hopeful and the hopeless, 2013 
 Essays in honour of Hon. Justice Bolarinwa Babalakin, 2003 
 Essays in honour of Hon. Justice Salihu Modibbo Alfa Begore, the honourable chief justice of Nigeria, 2006

Professional membership 
Professor Egbewole is member of professional associations, which includes:

 Nigerian Bar Association
 National Association of Law Teachers 
 American Society of International Law
 African Bar Association
 International Bar Association
 Chartered Institute of Arbitrators (UK).

References

External links 
 Wahab Olasupo Egbewole on Google Scholar
 Egbewole, Wahab O on WorldCat Identities

Senior Advocates of Nigeria
Nigerian academics
Nigerian lawyers
Nigerian academic administrators
Nigerian men by occupation
Year of birth missing (living people)
Living people